Judith Blume (née Sussman; born February 12, 1938) is an American writer of children's, young adult and adult fiction. Blume began writing in 1959 and has published more than 25 novels. Among her best-known works are Are You There God? It's Me, Margaret (1970), Tales of a Fourth Grade Nothing (1972), Deenie (1973), and Blubber (1974). Blume's books have significantly contributed to children's and young adult literature.

Blume was born and raised in Elizabeth, New Jersey, and graduated from New York University in 1961. As an attempt to entertain herself in her role as a homemaker, Blume began writing stories. Blume has been married three times. As of 2020, she had three children and one grandson.

Blume was one of the first young adult authors to write some of her novels focused on teenagers about the controversial topics of masturbation, menstruation, teen sex, birth control, and death. Her novels have sold over 82 million copies and have been translated into 32 languages.

She has won many awards for her writing, including American Library Association (ALA)'s Margaret A. Edwards Award in 1996 for her contributions to young adult literature. She was recognized as a Library of Congress Living Legend and awarded the 2004 National Book Foundation medal for distinguished contribution to American letters.

Blume's novels are popular and widely admired. They are praised for teaching children and young adults about their bodies. However, the mature topics in Blume's books have generated criticism and controversy. The ALA has named Blume as one of the most frequently challenged authors of the 21st century. There have been several adaptations of Blume's novels. The most well-known adaptation was the movie Tiger Eyes, released in 2012, with Willa Holland starring as Davey.

Biography

Early life 
Blume was born on February 12, 1938, and raised in Elizabeth, New Jersey, the daughter of homemaker Esther Sussman (née Rosenfeld) and dentist Rudolph Sussman. She has a brother, David, who is five years older. Her family was culturally Jewish. Blume witnessed hardships and death throughout her childhood. In third grade, Blume's older brother had a kidney infection that led Blume, her brother, and her mother to temporarily move to Miami Beach to help him recover for two years. Blume's father stayed behind to continue working. Additionally, in 1951 and 1952, there were three airplane crashes in her hometown of Elizabeth. 118 people died in the crashes, and Blume's father, who was a dentist, helped to identify the unrecognizable remains. Blume says she "buried" these memories until she began writing her 2015 novel In the Unlikely Event, the plot of which revolves around the crashes. Throughout her childhood, Blume participated in many creative activities such as dance and piano. Blume attributes her love of reading as a trait passed on by her parents. She has recalled spending much of her childhood creating stories in her head. Despite the love of stories, as a child Blume did not dream of being a writer.

She graduated from the all-girls' Battin High School in 1956, then enrolled in Boston University. A few weeks into the first semester, she was diagnosed with mononucleosis and took a brief leave from school. In 1959, Blume's father died. Later that same year, on August 15, 1959, she married lawyer John M. Blume, whom she had met while a student at New York University. Blume graduated from New York University in 1961 with a bachelor's degree in Education.

Adult life 
After college, Blume's daughter Randy Lee Blume was born and Blume became a homemaker. In 1963, she gave birth to her son, Lawrence Andrew Blume. Blume began writing when her children began nursery school. John M. Blume and Judy Blume were divorced in 1975, and John M. Blume died on September 20, 2020. Shortly after her separation, she met Thomas A. Kitchens, a physicist. The couple married in 1975, and they moved to New Mexico for Kitchens' work. They divorced in 1978.

A few years later, a mutual friend introduced her to George Cooper, a former law professor turned non-fiction writer. Blume and Cooper were married in 1987. Cooper has one daughter from a previous marriage, Amanda, to whom Blume is very close.

In August 2012, Blume announced that she was diagnosed with breast cancer after undergoing a routine ultrasound before leaving for a five-week trip to Italy. Six weeks after her diagnosis, Blume underwent a mastectomy and breast reconstruction. Blume was cancer-free following this surgery and able to recover.

Randy Blume became a therapist with a sub-specialty in helping writers complete their works. She has one child, Elliot Kephart, who is credited with encouraging his grandmother, Judy Blume, to write the most recent "Fudge" books. Lawrence Blume is now a movie director, producer, and writer. As of 2021, Cooper and Blume resided in Key West.

Career
A lifelong avid reader, Blume first began writing through New York University courses when her children were attending preschool. Following two years of publisher rejections, Blume published her first book, The One in the Middle Is the Green Kangaroo, in 1969. A year later, Blume published her second book, Iggie's House (1970), which was originally written as a story in Trailblazer magazine but then rewritten by Blume into a book. The decade that followed proved to be her most prolific, with 13 more books being published. Her third book was Are You There God? It's Me, Margaret. (1970), which was a breakthrough best-seller and a trailblazing novel in young adult literature. Are You There God? It's Me, Margaret established Blume as a leading voice in young adult literature. Some of Blume's other novels during the decade include Tales of a Fourth Grade Nothing (1972), Otherwise Known as Sheila the Great (1972), and Blubber (1974).

In 1975, Blume published the now frequently banned novel Forever, which was groundbreaking in young adult literature as the first novel to display teen sex as normal. Blume explained that she was inspired to write this novel when her daughter, 13 years old at the time, said she wanted to read a book where the characters have sex but do not die afterward. These novels tackled complex subjects such as family conflict, bullying, body image, and sexuality. Blume has expressed that she writes about these subjects, particularly sexuality because it is what she believes children need to know about and was what she wondered about as a child.

After publishing novels for young children and teens, Blume tackled another genre—adult reality and death. Her novels Wifey (1978) and Smart Women (1983) reached the top of The New York Times Best Seller list. Wifey became a bestseller with over 4 million copies sold. Blume's third adult novel, Summer Sisters (1998), was widely praised and sold more than three million copies. Despite its popularity, Summer Sisters (1998) faced a lot of criticism for its sexual content and inclusion of homosexual themes. Several of Blume's books appear on the list of top all-time bestselling children's books. As of 2020, her books have sold over 82 million copies and they have been translated into 32 languages. Although Blume has not published a novel since 2015 (In the Unlikely Event), she continues to write. In October 2017, Yale University acquired Blume's archive, which included some unpublished early work.

In addition to writing books, Blume has been an activist against banned books in America. In the 1980s, when her books started facing censorship and controversy, she began reaching out to other writers, as well as teachers and librarians, to join the fight against censorship. This led Blume to join the National Coalition Against Censorship which aims to protect the freedom to read. As of 2020, Blume is still a board member for the National Coalition Against Censorship. She is also the founder and trustee of a charitable and education foundation, called The Kids Fund. Blume serves on the board for other organizations such as, the Authors Guild; the Society of Children's Book Writers and Illustrators; the Key West Literary Seminar; and the National Coalition Against Censorship." In 2018, Blume and her husband opened a non-profit book store called Books & Books located in Key West.

Reception 
Blume's novels have been read by millions and have flourished throughout generations. The element in her work readers are said to love most is Blume's openness and honesty regarding issues like divorce, sexuality, puberty, and bullying. Her first-person narrative writing has gained positive appraisal for its relatability and its ability to discuss difficult subjects without judgment or harshness. Following the publishing of Are You There God? It’s Me, Margaret (1970), Blume received many letters from young girls telling her how much they loved the book and identified with Margaret. Female novelists have praised Blume for her “taboo-trampling” literature that left readers feeling like they learned something about their bodies from reading her books. For example, Deenie (1973) explained masturbation and Forever (1975) taught young women about losing their virginity. Blume's children's books have also been praised for their delicate way of portraying hardships kids can face at a young age. It’s Not the End of the World (1972) helped many kids understand divorce and the Fudge book series explored the various aspects of loving siblings despite the rivalry.

Blume's novels have received much criticism and controversy. Parents, librarians, book critics, and political groups have wanted her books to be banned. When her first books were published in the 1970s, Blume has recalled facing little censorship. With the election of Ronald Reagan in 1980, the number of book censors rapidly grew. Since 1980, Blume's novels have been a central topic of controversy in young adult literature. Critics of Blume's novels say that she places too much emphasis on the physical and sexual sides of growing up, ignoring the development of morals and emotional maturity. Five of Blume's books were included in the American Library Association (ALA) list of the top 100 most banned books of the 1990s, with Forever (1975) in seventh place. Forever is censored for its inclusion of teen sex and birth control. Blume recalls that the principal of her children's elementary school would not put Are You There God? It’s Me, Margaret in the library because the story involves menstruation. Conservative and religious groups continuously attempt to ban Are You There God? It’s Me, Margaret for the novel's portrayal of a young girl going through puberty claiming that it violates certain religious views.  Blume's children's novels have also been criticized for these reasons, especially Blubber (1974), which many believed sent the message to readers that kids could do wrong and not face punishment.

Awards and honors 
Judy Blume has won more than 90 literary awards, including three lifetime achievement awards in the United States. In 1994, she received the Golden Plate Award of the American Academy of Achievement. The ALA Margaret A. Edwards Award recognizes one author who has made significant contributions to young adult literature. Blume won the annual award in 1996 and the ALA considered her book Forever, published in 1975, was groundbreaking for its honest portrayal of high school seniors in love for the first time. In April 2000, the Library of Congress named her to its Living Legends in the Writers and Artists category for her significant contributions to America's cultural heritage. Blume received an honorary doctor of arts degree from Mount Holyoke College and was the main speaker at their annual commencement ceremony in 2003. In 2004 she received the annual Distinguished Contribution to American Letters Medal of the National Book Foundation for her enrichment of American literary heritage. In 2009, the National Coalition Against Censorship (NCAC) honored Blume for her lifelong commitment to free speech and her courage to battle censorship in literature. Blume also received the 2017 E.B. White Award from the American Academy of Arts and Letters for lifetime achievement in children's literature. In 2020, Blume was named an Honoree for Distinguished Service to the Literary Community by the Authors Guild Foundation.

Media adaptations
The first media adaptation of Blume's novels was the production of a TV film based on Blume's novel Forever that premiered on CBS in 1978. Forever is the story of two teenagers in high school, Katherine Danziger and Michael Wagner, who fall in love for the first time. The film starred Stephanie Zimbalist as Katherine Danziger and Dean Butler as Michael Wagner. A decade later, in 1988, Blume and her son wrote and executive produced a small film adaptation of Otherwise Known as Sheila the Great. The film was later shown on ABC. In 1995, a Fudge TV series was produced based on Blume's novel Fudge-a-Mania. The show ran from 1995 to 1997 with the first season aired on ABC and the second on CBS. The series starred Jake Richardson as Peter Warren Hatcher, the storyteller, and Luke Tarsitano as Farley Drexel "Fudge" Hatcher.

In 2012, Blume's 1981 novel Tiger Eyes was adapted into a film version. This was the first of Blume's novels to be turned into a theatrical feature film. Tiger Eyes is the story of a teenage girl, Davey, who struggles to cope with the sudden death of her father, Adam Wexler. The screenplay was co-written by Blume and her son, Lawrence Blume, who was also the director. Tiger Eyes stars Willa Holland as Davey and Amy Jo Johnson as Gwen Wexler.

Blume is the subject of the 2018 song "Judy Blume" by Amanda Palmer. Thematically, the song explains to the listener Blume's role in Palmer's adolescent life. The song explains Blume's books as influential in Palmer's understanding of intimate and female-centered subjects such as puberty, menstruation, and the male gaze, and universal subjects like molestation, eating disorders, poverty, grief, and parental divorce.

She is the subject of the documentary film Judy Blume Forever, which premiered at the 2023 Sundance Film Festival.

Are You There God? It’s Me, Margaret was announced as a feature film in February 2021. A trailer for the movie was released January 2023. It has an expected theatrical release date of April 28, 2023.

Works

Children’s books 
 The One in the Middle Is the Green Kangaroo (1969)
 Iggie's House (1970)
 Tales of a Fourth Grade Nothing (1972)
 Otherwise Known as Sheila the Great (1972)
 It's Not the End of the World (1972)
 The Pain and the Great One (1974)
 Blubber (1974)
 Starring Sally J. Freedman as Herself (1977)
 Freckle Juice (1978)
 Superfudge (1980)
 Fudge-a-Mania (1990)
 Double Fudge (2002)
 Soupy Saturdays with the Pain and the Great One (2007)
 Cool Zone with the Pain and the Great One (2008)
 Going, Going, Gone! With the Pain and the Great One (2008)
 Friend or Fiend? With the Pain and the Great One (2008)

Young adult books 
 Are You There God? It’s Me, Margaret (1970)
 Then Again, Maybe I Won’t (1971)
 Deenie (1973)
 Forever... (1975)
 Tiger Eyes (1981)
 Just as Long as We're Together (1987)
 Here's to You, Rachel Robinson (1993)
 Places I Never Meant to Be (1999)

Adult books 
 Wifey (1978)
 Smart Women (1983)
 Summer Sisters (1998)
 In the Unlikely Event (2015)

Collaborative short stories 
 It’s Fine to Be Nine (2000)
 It’s Heaven to Be Seven (2000)

Non-fiction books 
 The Judy Blume Diary (1981)
 Letter to Judy: What Your Kids Wish They Could Tell You (1986)
 The Judy Blume Memory Book (1988)

Other awards
Blume's other awards include:
 1970: Outstanding Book of the Year from The New York Times for Are You There God? It’s Me, Margaret
 1974: Outstanding Book of the Year from The New York Times for Blubber
 1981: Children’ Choice Award from the International Reading Association and Children's’ Book Council for Superfudge
 1983: Eleanor Roosevelt Humanitarian Award
 1984: Carl Sandberg Freedom to Read Award, from the Chicago Public Library
 1986: Civil Liberties Award from the Atlanta Civil Liberties Union
 1988: South Australian Youth Media Award for Best Author
 2005: Time magazine All-Time 100 Novels List for Are You There God? It’s Me, Margaret
 2009: University of Southern Mississippi Medallion for lifelong contributions to children's literature
 2010: Inducted into New Jersey Hall of Fame
 2010: Inducted into Harvard Lampoon
 2011: Smithsonian Associates: The McGovern Award
 2013: Chicago Tribune: Young Adult Literary Prize
 2013: New Atlantic Independent Booksellers Association (NAIBA) Legacy Award
 2013: The NAIBA Legacy Award
 2013: Assembly on Literature for Adolescents (ALAN) Award
 2013: National Coalition of Teachers of English (NCTE) National Intellectual Freedom Award
 2015: Catholic Library Association: Regina Award
 2018: Carl Sandburg Literary Award from the Chicago Public Library Foundation

References

Further reading
 Blume, Judy (1999). Authors and Artists for Young Adults (Gale Research), 26: 7–17. Summarizes and extends 1990 article, with more emphasis on Blume's impact and censorship issues. By R. Garcia-Johnson.
 Blume, Judy (1990). Authors and Artists for Young Adults (Gale Research), 3: 25–36. Incorporates extensive passages from published interviews with Blume.
 Lee, Betsy. Judy Blume's Story, Dillon Pr., 1981. .

External links

 
 
 
 Most frequently challenged authors of the 21st century at American Library Association Banned & Challenged Books
 Interview with Maryann Weidt, author of Presenting Judy Blume (1993) – NORTHERN LIGHTS Minnesota Author Interview TV Series #259
 Speak Freely Amongst Yourselves: Censorship and Its Affect on the Arts (1993) at YouTube – television special with Blume as one panel member

1938 births
Living people
20th-century American novelists
20th-century American women writers
21st-century American novelists
21st-century American women writers
American children's writers
American feminist writers
American women novelists
American young adult novelists
Jewish American writers
Jewish feminists
Jewish women writers
Jewish American artists
Margaret A. Edwards Award winners
Writers from Elizabeth, New Jersey
Writers from Plainfield, New Jersey
People from Scotch Plains, New Jersey
Steinhardt School of Culture, Education, and Human Development alumni
American women children's writers
American erotica writers
Women erotica writers
Women writers of young adult literature
Novelists from New Jersey
21st-century American Jews